Gerard Wigmana (27 September 1673, in Workum – 27 May 1741, in Amsterdam), was an 18th-century painter from the Northern Netherlands.

Biography

In 1697 he painted a curious group portrait of a family dinner, with the title Mayor Saco van Aitzema of Dokkum and his wife offer Tsar Peter the Great a meal in Amsterdam.
He travelled to Rome after that, because according to Houbraken, Wigmana met with the painter Daniel Seiter in Rome in 1699. Houbraken mentioned him again in his biographical sketch of Pieter van Mierevelt, because Wigmana owned one of his paintings. Houbraken intended to write a biographical sketch of Wigmana in his birth year of 1673, but never got that far (he died before publication of Volume III, which ended with birth year 1659).  
According to the RKD he was a pupil of Jelle Sibrands and travelled to Rome where he received the nickname Friese Raphael.
According to Johan van Gool, who called him a narcissus in his biographical sketch of him, Wigmana was in Rome in 1700, but Van Gool did not believe that he got his nickname from joining the Bentvueghels, but rather that Wigmana received his nickname of the Frisian Raphael because he made so many copies of the works of Raphael. Wigmana wrote a book about the art of painting that was published after his death in 1742, and which contained his autobiography with an engraving by Bernard Picart after a self-portrait.

References

Gerard Wigmana on Artnet
 Korte schets of denkbeeld, om tot een groote volmaaktheid in de schilderkonst te geraken, opgeteld door Gerardus Wigmana, in zijn leven berucht schilder, uit zijn eigen handschrift te zamen gesteld, by Gerardus Wigmana, Amsterdam, 1742

1673 births
1741 deaths
18th-century Dutch painters
18th-century Dutch male artists
Dutch male painters
Dutch art historians
People from Nijefurd